is a Japanese boxing manga series written by Asao Takamori and illustrated by Tetsuya Chiba. The story follows a young boxer named Joe Yabuki, who lives in the Tokyo slums.

Ashita no Joe was first serialized by Kodansha in Weekly Shonen Magazine from January 1, 1968, to May 13, 1973, and was later collected into 20 tankōbon volumes. During its serialization, it was popular with working-class people and college students in Japan. It has been adapted into various media, including Megalo Box, an anime that was made as a part of the 50th anniversary of Ashita no Joe.


Volume list
<onlyinclude>

References

Ashita no Joe